Henry Boyle, 1st Baron Carleton,  (12 July 1669 – 31 March 1725) was an Anglo-Irish Whig politician who sat in the Irish House of Commons from 1692 to 1695 and in the English and British House of Commons between 1689 and 1710. He served as Chancellor of the Exchequer and Secretary of State, and after he was raised to the peerage as Baron Carleton, served as Lord President of the council.

Biography
Boyle was the son of Charles Boyle, 3rd Viscount Dungarvan, and his first wife Lady Jane Seymour, daughter of William Seymour. He was educated at Westminster School and travelled abroad from 1685 to 1688, attending Padua University in 1685. He entered the army under the auspices of his uncle, the Tory politician Lord Rochester.  However, Boyle himself became a Whig, and in 1688 deserted the army of James II in favour of the Prince of Orange.

In 1689, he was elected Member of Parliament for Tamworth, but was defeated the next year. He spent the next two years in Ireland managing the family estates and represented Cork County in the Irish House of Commons in 1692. Also in 1692, he was returned as MP for Cambridge University at a by election on 21 November 1692, having been admitted at Trinity College, Cambridge on 9 November, and was awarded MA in 1693. He became a prominent spokesman of the "country" opposition, but in 1697 he switched to the court party.  Here he advanced quickly, becoming a Lord of the Treasury in 1699 and Chancellor of the Exchequer of England in 1701.

Boyle picked up other offices during his career, becoming Lord Lieutenant of the West Riding of Yorkshire and Lord Treasurer of Ireland in 1704, and was elected member for Westminster at the 1705 English general election.  With the departure of Harley and his followers from the government, Boyle became Secretary of State for the Northern Department and Lord Treasurer Godolphin's principal lieutenant in the Commons.  His and Godolphin's dominance in the ministry was increasingly overshadowed by the power of the Junto of Whig aristocrats, however, and in 1710 he retired from office and withdrew from politics with the arrival of Harley's new Tory ministry.

Baron Carleton
With the Hanoverian succession in 1714, Boyle was raised to the peerage as Baron Carleton, and became Lord President in 1721, an office in which he continued until his death in 1725.

Carlton Way, a road in north Cambridge that follows the path of the Roman Akeman Street, and the public house The Carlton Arms on the same road, are named after him.

References

|-

|-

1669 births
1725 deaths
Barons in the Peerage of Great Britain
British MPs 1707–1708
British MPs 1708–1710
Chancellors of the Exchequer of England
English army officers
Boyle, Henry
Lord-Lieutenants of the West Riding of Yorkshire
Lord Presidents of the Council
Boyle, Henry
Boyle, Henry
Members of the Parliament of Ireland (pre-1801) for County Cork constituencies
Members of the Privy Council of Ireland
Members of the Privy Council of Great Britain
People educated at Westminster School, London
Alumni of Trinity College, Cambridge
Boyle, Henry
Younger sons of viscounts
Henry
Lord High Treasurers of Ireland
English MPs 1695–1698
English MPs 1698–1700
English MPs 1701–1702
English MPs 1702–1705
English MPs 1705–1707
Whig members of the pre-1707 English Parliament